Bocage's sunbird (Nectarinia bocagii) is a species of bird in the family Nectariniidae.
It is found in Angola and the DRC.

The common name and Latin binomial commemorate the Portuguese naturalist José Vicente Barbosa du Bocage.

References

External links

Bocage's sunbird
Birds of Central Africa
Bocage's sunbird
Taxonomy articles created by Polbot